Slavonski Brod railway station is a railway station on Novska–Tovarnik railway. Located in Slavonski Brod. Railroad continued to Sibinj in one and the other direction to Garčin. Slavonski Brod railway station consists of 20 railway tracks.

It - or rather, a mock-up of an older version - appeared in "Murder on the Orient Express" [2017] in the closing scene.

See also 
 Croatian Railways
 Zagreb–Belgrade railway

References 

Railway stations in Croatia